Madonna of the Dry Tree or Our Lady of the Barren Tree is a small oil-on-oak panel painting dated c. 1462–1465, attributed to the Early Netherlandish painter Petrus Christus. Itt shows the Virgin Mary and the Christ Child standing on a disembodied dead tree trunk. The painting's imagery is unusually dark and dramatic and shows a encircled woman within folds of black and withered branches that may represent a crown of thorns.

The panel is unsigned panel and unknown until 1919, when it was examined by the art historian Grete Ring. She first attributed Christus, identified  its iconography, and assigned its current title. The circumstances of the panel's commission and iconography are still relatively understudied, although its size indicates it was intended for private devotion.

Its stark and haunting imagery is thought to be derived from the Book of Ezekiel, with the Dry Tree (or solitary tree) representing a withered and dead version of the Garden of Eden's Tree of Knowledge, brought back to life by presence of the Virgin and Christ. The 15 golden "A"s hanging from its branches may represent the first letter of the Angelus, Angelus Domini nuntiavit Mariae. The painting may draw from the beliefs of Confraternity of Our Lady of the Dry Tree of Bruges, which Christus and his wife Gaudicine joined so as to integrate themselves into the city's upper realms of society.

Description

Mary stands in the fork of the barren tree, and is surrounded by thin and spiky branches in an oval arch stretching around her. She supports the Christ child in one arm, and holds his dangling feet in the other. She wears wears a bright vermilion robe, with green lining and folds painted in sharp, sculptural lines. Except for a single thin band of ermine, the blue dress is plain and unadorned, and closely resembles the dress in Christus's Exeter Madonna. Unusually for a Northern Renaissance Madonna, her face is individualised; her features are not soft nor rounded as with idealised models, and her expression less presupposing than earlier Madonna's or secular female portraits. The art historian Joel Upton describes her depiction as a "warm and human figure...very attractive, and yet serene and demure as the Mother of God."

The representation of Christ is probably derived from Rogier van der Weyden, given his playfulness and amiable facial expression. As Christus might not have had access to the older master's work, the influence was likely second-hand, perhaps through the paintings of Hans Memling.

The panel adopts an illustionistic scale, perhaps influenced by van der Weyden's Durán Madonna, in which Mary is placed in a undefined space that seems much smaller than her physical presence. Both Rogier's and Christus's figures are similarly larger than scale and cramped within a shallow and sculptural niche. They are brightly lit compared to the black background. Christus employs trompe-l'œil techniques in a number of passages, creating a three-dimensional effect that adds to the strangeness and disembodied atmosphere. These can be most notably seen in the Virgin's hand as it lies below the child's toes, in the orb held in his hands, and in the golden letters hanging from the tree briars.

X-radiography indicates tlittle preparatory underdrawing, outside of a series of ruled lines, were used to position the figures and surrounding elements within the overall design. The art historian Maryan Ainsworth notes that this is typical of Christus's smaller panels, some which can be considered miniatures, and compares it to contemporary illuminated manuscripts.

Confraternity

The painting may be associated to the confraternity of "Our Lady of the Dry Tree". The confraternity was closely associated with Philip the Good who, they believed, prayed to an image of the Virgin carved on a tree during a battle against the French; following his victory he is said to have established "Our Lady of the Dry Tree", although it is documented as extant as early as 1396. Its seal, visible on extant ledgers, shows a thorny dry tree with dangling As.

The confraternity met in a chapel at the Franciscans Church of the Minorites (Minoritenkirche).  Membership was restricted to the upper echelon of Burgundian society, and included Philip's wife Isabella of Portugal, most of the leading Burgundian nobles, and upper-class families and foreign traders of Bruges, such as the Portinaris. Christus and his wife Guadicine were listed as members in 1462, and appear on the list of new members the following year.  He joined the fraternity for the same reason Gerard David would some years later: to establish himself in Bruges society and attract wealthy patrons.  A 1469 contract Christus cosigned indicates he may have assumed an administrative role for the organization, as well as being a board member.

Although the iconography is clearly associated with the confraternity, it is not known whether Christus received a commission from the organization or from an individual member. The confraternity's inventory of 1495 does not list a painting of the Dry Tree. Its small size suggests that it may have been commissioned as a private devotional piece.

Iconography
The wilted and thorny tree may be a dark representation of the biblical "Tree of Knowledge". Art historians see it as a metaphor for original sin, that will remain dead until redeemed by the second coming of Christ. The iconography  maybe based on the Ezekiel 17:24: "...and all the trees of the field shall know that I the Lord have brought down the high tree, have exalted the low tree, have dried up the green tree, and have made the dry tree to flourish". 

The French  philosopher Guillaume de Deguileville (b. 1295) wrote in Le Pèlerinage de l'Âme ("The Pilgrimage of the Soul") that so as the Tree of Knowledge received a graft from the Tree of Life, bringing it back to life, the barren Saint Anne gave birth to Mary. Ainsworth sees the panel as "almost a literal translation of de Deguileville's text" – the green graft symbolizes Mary who in turn gives birth to the Christ child, "the fruit of this growth and Savior of Mankind". The orb and cross in his hands and the spiny thorns fashioned into a surrounding crown indicate his role as Savior, while the dry tree itself may be a representation of both the Fall of Man and Redemption.

The 15 golden letter A's hanging from the branches are generally interpreted as abbreviations for the Ave Maria ("Hail Mary") prayer. Their number may allude to the 150 Hail Mary's recited in the contemporary rosary; that is 15 rounds of 10 decades), although this form did not become popular until 1475, some ten years after Christus' panel. Two other interpretations for the A's have been put forth. One is that they symbolize arbor or arbore, as other similar devotional works show the trees in an arbor. Hugo van der Velden suggests the possibility that the piece might have been commissioned by a member of the confraternity, Anselme Adornes (d. 1464), whose interest in devotional work is evidenced by his possession of van Eyck's Saint Francis Receiving the Stigmata.

Ainsworth describes the iconography's darkness as unprecedented in Netherlandish painting. The art historian Bernhard Ridderbos sees the panel as a unique "miraculous cult image", rather than a typical late medieval illustration of a biblical scene. Its size at  suggests it was almost certainly meant as an intimate personal devotional object with the viewer's attention directed only on the mother, child, and tree; its presentation and immediacy attracts to the point that it becomes a "subjective extension" of reality.

Dating and attribution

Most scholars suggested a completion date in the range of the mid-1440s to the early–1460s, based on factors such as the near identical red robe worn by Mary in Christus's Exeter Madonna and that painting's similarities to van Eyck's c. 1441 Madonna of Jan Vos.  A date of 1462-63 or later is most likely correct, based on Christus's relationship with the Confraternity of the Dry Tree, and the stylistic influences from van der Weyden incorporated into Christus's later works.

Grete Ring was the first art historian to undertake a complete study of the painting, when in 1919 she definitively attributed to Christus, which has not been challenged since.

The panel is very similar to the central panel of a 1620 triptych by Pieter Claeissens the Younger, which may draw from the same sources.

Provenance
The painting was in the Ernst Oppler collection, Berlin, before 1919. That year Ring published the first analysis of the painting, attributing Christus in her article "Onse Lieve Vrauwe ten Drooghen Boome" for the Zeitschrift für bildende Kunst. It passed to the collection of Fritz Thyssen in Mülheim, before it was acquired by the Swiss billionaire Hans Heinrich Von Thyssen for the Museo Thyssen-Bornemisza, Madrid, in 1965.

It was exhibited at the National Gallery of Art in Washington, D.C. in October 1981 as part of a loan from the Thyssen‐Bornemisza.

Notes

References

Citations

Sources

 Ainsworth, Maryan. Petrus Christus: Renaissance Master of Bruges. New York: Metropolitan Museum of Art, 1994. 
 Ainsworth, Maryan. "The Business of Art: Patrons, Clients and Art Markets". In: Maryan Ainsworth, et al. (eds.) From Van Eyck to Bruegel: Early Netherlandish Painting in the Metropolitan Museum of Art. New York: Metropolitan Museum of Art, 1998. 
 Eisler, Colin. Early Netherlandish Painting: The Thyssen-Bornemisza Collection. New York NY: Philip Wilson, 2003. 
 Friedländer, Max. Early Netherlandish Painting Volume 1. The van Eycks, Petrus Christus. New York NY: Springer, 1975. 
 Kren, Scott; McKendrick, Scot; Ainsworth, Maryan; Moodey, Elizabeth J. "Illuminating the Renaissance: The Triumph of Flemish Manuscript Painting". Renaissance Quarterly. Volume 57, No. 3, Autumn 2004
 Nosow, Robert. Ritual Meanings in the Fifteenth-Century Motet. Cambridge: Cambridge University Press, 2012. 
 Richardson, Carol. Locating Renaissance Art: Renaissance Art Reconsidered. New Haven CT: Yale University Press, 2007. 
 Ridderbos, Bernhard; Van Buren, Anne; Van Veen, Henk. Early Netherlandish Paintings: Rediscovery, Reception and Research. Amsterdam: Amsterdam University Press, 2005. 
 Rosenbaum, Allen. Old Master Paintings from the Collection of Baron Thyssen-Bornemisza. Washington, DC: The International Exhibitions Foundation, 1979. 
 Schabacker, Peter. Petrus Christus. Utrecht: Haentjens Dekker & Gumbert, 1974. OCLC: 891333737
 Sterling, Charles. "Observations on Petrus Christus". The Art Bulletin, Volume 53, No. 1, March 1971. 
 Van der Velden, Hugo. "Petrus Christus's Our Lady of the Dry Tree". Journal of the Warburg and Courtauld Institutes, Volume 60, 1997. 
 Upton, Joel Morgan. Petrus Christus: His Place in Fifteenth-Century Flemish Painting. Penn State Press, 1990.

External links
 Catalog entry at the Museo Thyssen-Bornemisza, Madrid

Paintings by Petrus Christus
Paintings of the Madonna and Child
Paintings in the Thyssen-Bornemisza Museum